John Farrell (18 December 1851 – 8 January 1904) was an Australian poet and journalist.

Early life
Farrell was born in Buenos Aires, Argentina, third son of Andrew Farrell, a chemist, and his wife Mary née Parley.  His parents left Dublin, Ireland in 1847 and settled in Buenos Aires.  Towards the end of 1852 Andrew Farrell went to Victoria (Australia), with his wife, and children, and engaged first in gold-digging, and then in carrying, before settling down as a farmer. John Farrell was initially educated by his parents and later at a private school. His mother died in 1862, and he had little formal education although his father encouraged his taste for reading. The boy worked on farms, and when he was 19 worked in a brewery at Bendigo, Victoria. He spent some time in Darwin, Northern Territory, gold-digging and then travelled around Australia for some time, working as a brewer again, spending time as a farmer or brewer for several years.

Literary career
In 1878 Farrell published, using the name John O'Farrell, Ephemera: An Iliad of Albury, a small pamphlet of verse, and a rare Australian publication. Two Stories, a Fragmentary Poem was published in Melbourne in 1882, and about this period he began to be a regular contributor to The Bulletin. He was then working in a brewery at Albury, New South Wales and in 1883 was a partner in a brewery at Goulburn. He became much interested in the tenets of Henry George after reading Progress and Poverty. In January 1887 a collection of Farrell's verses was published in Sydney entitled How He Died and Other Poems which was favourably reviewed. Also in 1887 he sold his brewery interests and went to Sydney hoping to obtain employment as a journalist. He bought a paper, the Lithgow, New South Wales Enterprise, but was unable to make it a financial success, and in 1889 returned to Sydney to edit the Australian Standard, a single tax paper for which Farrell did much writing. 
In 1888 Farrell started a paper called, "The Land Nationalizer" at Lithgow, and it was as the advocate of the single-tax doctrine that he was first known outside purely literary circles.

In October 1889 Farrell began a series of articles on George's theories for the Sydney Daily Telegraph, and in the following year joined its staff. When Henry George arrived in Sydney in March he was met by Farrell who accompanied him on his inland tour, they became great friends. In June 1890 Farrell was appointed editor of the Sydney Daily Telegraph, but soon decided he could not cope and resigned three months later.

Late life and legacy
Farrell continued to be a regular contributor to the Telegraph until 1903 due to Bright's disease on 8 January 1904. Farrell had married in November 1876 Elizabeth Watts, who survived him with four sons and three daughters. In 1904 a memorial edition of Farrell's poems was published with a memoir by the critic Bertram Stevens under the title of My Sundowner and other Poems. This was re-issued in 1905 as How He Died and other Poems. The contents differ substantially from the 1887 volume of the same name. Farrell's gravestone is inscribed with:
Sleep Heart of Gold! 'Twas not in vain
You loved the struggling and the poor,
And taught, in sweet and strenuous strain
To battle and endure.
The lust of wealth, the pride of place,
Were not a light to guide thy feet,
But larger hopes and wider space
For hearts to beat.

Bibliography

 Two Stories : A Fragmentary Poem (1882)
 How He Died and Other Poems (1887)
 My Sundowner and Other Poems (1904)
 An Iliad of Albury and Other Poems (2002)

Biography
 Stenhouse, Paul, John Farrell: Poet, journalist and social reformer, 1851-1904, North Melbourne: Australian Scholarly Publishing, ;

References

External links

Australia to England poem by Farrell
An Iliad of Albury and Other Poems by John Farrell book review

1851 births
1904 deaths
19th-century Australian poets